Paragorgiidae is a family of corals, a member of the phylum Cnidaria.

Genera
Genera in this family include:
 Paragorgia Milne-Edwards, 1857
 Sibogagorgia Stiasny, 1937

References

 
Scleraxonia
Cnidarian families